Beth Cindy Levine (April 7, 1960 – June 15, 2020) was an American microbiologist. She was an investigator at the Howard Hughes Medical Institute (HHMI), Professor of Internal Medicine and Microbiology, Director of the Center for Autophagy Research and Charles Cameron Sprague Distinguished Chair in Biomedical Sciences at the University of Texas Southwestern Medical Center. She specialized in the field of autophagy; more specifically in its regulation and its role in diverse diseases, including cancer and infectious diseases. Levine was described as a pioneer in the field of modern mammalian autophagy.

Biography 
Beth Levine was born on April 7, 1960 in Newark, New Jersey. She grew up in New Jersey with older brothers, before graduating high school a year early. Levine died at home on June 15, 2020 from breast cancer. She is survived by her husband, Milton Packer, and children Rachel and Ben.

Education
Beth Levine graduated magna cum laude in 1981 with a bachelor's degree in French studies from Brown University. She then went on to complete her M.D. at Cornell University Medical College, New York.  She completed her internship and residency in Internal Medicine at Mount Sinai Hospital in New York City. While there, she published a study called "Elevated Circulating Levels of Tumor Necrosis Factor in Severe Chronic Heart Failure" with her future husband and cardiologist Dr. Milton Packer. She completed her fellowship in "infectious diseases and the pathogenesis of neurotropic viruses" at Johns Hopkins University, Baltimore.

Career 
Beth Levine served as Director of Virology Research at Columbia University from 1994 to 2004. She was recruited to become the Chief of Infectious Diseases at the University of Texas Southwestern Medical Center from 2004–2011. She became the Director of Autophagy Research in 2011. She served as a professor of internal medicine and microbiology at the University of Texas Southwestern Medical Center up until the time of her death. Levine created the Gordon Conference on Autophagy in Stress, Development, and Disease in 2003. Since 2008, she served as an investigator with the Howard Hughes Medical Institute. Additionally, she was elected into the American Association of Physicians and the National Academy of Sciences.

In her research, Levine frequently performed cross-disciplinary experiments that opened the door to new areas for investigation. She experimented with a wide array of systems, including yeast, plant, nematode, mouse, and human. Levine discovered the first mammalian autophagy gene, Beclin 1, and later went on to directly associate this gene with the protein Bcl-2. This association provided significant implications in the realm of cell survival.

In a 1999 paper in Nature, she proposed that autophagy was linked to tumor suppression. In 2003, she confirmed the link between Beclin 1 and tumor suppression. Additionally, Levine demonstrated links between autophagy and breast cancer. She also proved a link between autophagy and viral infections, showing how the herpes simplex virus type-1 expressed a protein that blocked Beclin 1 activity. She was also able to show a link between autophagy and lifespan.

Levine and her team also made significant contributions in several selective fields of autophagy, including virophagy, xenophagy, and mitophagy, and she is credited for coining the term xenophagy. These contributions provided a greater understanding of the role of autophagy pathways in diseases like neurodegeneration, inflammatory disorders, and cancers. Levine's lab also worked on developing therapeutics for these diseases, including Tat-Beclin, an autophagy-inducing peptide.

Awards and Honours
1994 American Cancer Society Junior Faculty Research Award

2000 Inducted into American Society of Clinical Investigation (ASCI)

2004 Harvey Lecture

2004 Ellison Medical Foundation Senior Scholars Award in Global Infectious Diseases

2006 Membership in American Association of Physicians

2008 Appointed as Howard Hughes Medical Institute Investigator

2008 Edith and Peter O’Donnell Award in Medicine

2012 Fellowship in the American Association for the Advancement of Science

2013 Inducted into National Academy of Sciences

2013 Membership in the Academy of Medicine, Engineering and Science of Texas

2014 ASCI Stanley J. Korsmeyer Award

2018 Phyllis T. Bodel Women in Medicine Award from Yale University of Medicine

2018 Barcroft Medal from Queen’s University Belfast

References

External links

 http://www.utsouthwestern.edu/education/medical-school/departments/internal-medicine/centers/autophagy-research/index.html
 https://web.archive.org/web/20150928212451/http://www4.utsouthwestern.edu/idlabs/Levine2011/levineIndex.html

American infectious disease physicians
American medical researchers
1960 births
2020 deaths
Women microbiologists
20th-century American women scientists
21st-century American women scientists
Weill Cornell Medical College alumni
Johns Hopkins University alumni
Columbia University faculty
Columbia Medical School faculty
Howard Hughes Medical Investigators
University of Texas Southwestern Medical Center faculty
Cancer researchers
Phage workers
Brown University alumni
American women academics